The men's singles wheelchair tennis competition at the 2004 Summer Paralympics in Athens was held from 19 September to 26 September at the Athens Olympic Tennis Centre.

The Netherlands' Robin Ammerlaan defeated the defending gold medalist David Hall of Australia in the final, 6–2, 6–1 to win the gold medal in men's singles wheelchair tennis at the 2004 Athens Paralympics. In the bronze medal match, France's Michaël Jérémiasz defeated the United States' Stephen Welch.

Draw

Key
 INV = Bipartite invitation
 IP = ITF place
 ALT = Alternate
 r = Retired
 w/o = Walkover

Finals

Top half

Section 1

Section 2

Bottom half

Section 3

Section 4

References 
 

Men's singles